Albizia berteriana, the Bertero albizia, is a species of plant in the family Fabaceae. It is found in Cuba, the Dominican Republic, Haiti, and Jamaica.

Junior synonyms are:
 Acacia berteriana DC.
 Acacia littoralis A. Rich.
 Albizia berteriana (DC.) M.Gómez
 Albizzia berteriana (DC.) M.Gómez (orth.var.)
 Cathormion berteriana (DC.) Burkart
 Feuilleea berteriana (DC.) Kuntze
 Inga fragrans Macfad.
 Pithecellobium berterianum (DC.) Benth.
 Pithecellobium fragrans (Macfad.) Benth.
 Pithecolobium berterianum (DC.) Benth. (orth.var.)
 Pseudalbizzia berteriana (DC.) Britton & Rose

References

  (2005): Albizia berteriana (DC.) Fawc. & Rendle. Version 10.01, November 2005. Retrieved 5 August 2020.

berteriana
Flora of Cuba
Flora of the Dominican Republic
Flora of Haiti
Flora of Jamaica
Taxa named by Augustin Pyramus de Candolle
Taxonomy articles created by Polbot